Rudolf Falk (7 January 1898 – 6 September 1988) was a Swedish long-distance runner. He competed in the men's 5000 metres at the 1920 Summer Olympics.

References

1898 births
1988 deaths
Athletes (track and field) at the 1920 Summer Olympics
Swedish male long-distance runners
Olympic athletes of Sweden
Place of birth missing